The Rome and Vienna airport attacks were two major terrorist attacks carried out on 27 December 1985. Seven Arab terrorists attacked two airports in Rome, Italy, and Vienna, Austria, with assault rifles and hand grenades. Nineteen civilians were killed and over a hundred were injured before four of the terrorists were killed by El Al Security personnel and local police, who captured the remaining three.

The attacks

Rome attack
At 08:15 GMT, four Arab gunmen walked to the shared ticket counter for Israel's El Al Airlines and Trans World Airlines at Leonardo da Vinci-Fiumicino Airport outside Rome, Italy, fired assault rifles and threw grenades. They killed 16 and wounded 99, including American diplomat Wes Wessels, before three of the attackers were killed by El Al security, while the remaining one, Mohammed Sharam, was wounded and captured by the Italian police. The dead included General Donato Miranda Acosta, Mexican military attache, and his secretary, Genoveva Jaime Cisneros.

Vienna attack
Minutes later, at Schwechat Airport (Vienna International Airport) in Vienna, Austria, three terrorists carried out a similar attack. Hand grenades were thrown into crowds of passengers queuing to check in for a flight to Tel Aviv, killing two people instantly and wounding 39 others. A third victim died on 22 January 1986, of hand grenade wounds sustained in the attack. First response came from several Austrian police officers, who opened fire on the terrorists. They were supported by two plainclothes El Al security guards who helped to repel the attackers. Over 200 bullets were fired during the fight. The terrorists seized a Mercedes outside the terminal and fled, with Austrian police and El Al security guards giving chase. They killed one terrorist and captured the other two several miles from the airport after a short car chase and gun battle.

Aftermath
In all, the two strikes killed 19, including a child, and wounded around 140. Some contemporary reports claimed the gunmen originally intended to hijack El Al jets at the airports and blow them up over Tel Aviv; others concluded that the attack on waiting passengers was the original plan and that the Frankfurt airport was meant to be hit as well.

The attacks came after increased security due to recent hijackings and official Interpol warnings that airports might be targeted by terrorists during the holiday season.

Perpetrators
Italian authorities stated that receipts uncovered on the terrorists indicated that they had entered Italy a few weeks earlier and had stayed in hotels near Rome. They all had Moroccan passports. It was also reported that a note in Arabic was found on the body of one of the attackers, addressed to ''Zionists'' and announcing, ''the war has begun.'' The note was reportedly signed, ''the martyrs of Palestine.''

Israeli authorities first blamed the attacks on the Palestine Liberation Organization (PLO), but its leader, Yasser Arafat, denied the accusations and denounced the strikes. The PLO expressed 'indignation at the criminal act'' and asserted that the attacks were coordinated as part of a ''plot against the Palestinian cause'', intending to force Austria and Italy into severing ties with the Palestinians. PLO officials recalled that Arafat had recently pledged that coordinated armed Palestinian resistance would be confined to Israel and the occupied territories.

Responsibility for the two attacks was later claimed by the Abu Nidal Organization (ANO) in retaliation for Operation Wooden Leg, the Israeli bombing of PLO headquarters in Tunis on 1 October 1985. Libya was accused by the US of funding the terrorists who carried out the attacks; although they denied the charges, they did praise the assaults. According to published reports, sources close to Abu Nidal said Libyan intelligence supplied the weapons and the ANO's head of the Intelligence Directorate's Committee for Special Missions, Dr. Ghassan al-Ali, organized the attacks. Libya denied these charges as well, notwithstanding that it claimed they were "heroic operations carried out by the sons of the martyrs of Sabra and Shatila." Italian secret services blamed Syria and Iran.

The surviving terrorist in the Rome airport attack, Syrian national Mahmoud Ibrahim Khaled (Khalid Ibrahim), was sentenced to 30 years imprisonment in 1988. He was released early on good behavior in June 2010 and was living in Rome in 2011. He was employed, and had a girlfriend. In an interview with Il Messaggero, he condemned terrorism, expressed remorse for the attacks, and said that he prays for God's forgiveness. In 1987, an Austrian court sentenced the two surviving terrorists in the Vienna airport attack to life imprisonment.

See also
 Pan Am Flight 110
 2002 Los Angeles International Airport shooting 
 Terrorism in the European Union

References

External links
 Terrorist Attack at Vienna Airport in 1985 - ORF Austrian Broadcasting Corporation news
 Terrorists Kill 13 At El Al Offices – published on the Miami News on 27 December 1985
 El Al Attacks; 16 Dead, 100 Hurt – published on Lewiston Journal on 27 December 1985
 Terror raids leave 17 dead at Rome, Vienna airports Attack aimed at Israeli airline – published on the Toronto Star on 27 December 1985
 Terrorists Raid 2 Europe Airports – published on the Pittsburgh Press on 27 December 1985
 BBC: "On This Day"
 New York Times: "ITALY NOW LINKING SYRIANS TO ATTACK AT ROME AIRPORT"

1980s in Lazio
1985 murders in Italy
1985 murders in Austria
Abu Nidal attacks
Attacks in 1985
December 1985 crimes
December 1985 events in Europe
El Al accidents and incidents
Fiumicino
Mass murder in 1985
20th-century mass murder in Italy
Murder in Rome
Palestinian terrorist incidents in Europe
Schwechat
Terrorist attacks on airports
Terrorist incidents in Austria
Terrorist incidents in Europe in 1985
Terrorist incidents in Italy in 1985
Terrorist incidents in Lazio
Crime in Vienna